Gyna, also called porcelain roaches, are a genus of  cockroaches native to Africa.

Species

There are 31 accepted species in this genus:

Gyna aestuans Saussure, 1863
Gyna aetola Shelford, 1909
Gyna bisannulata Hanitsch, 1950
Gyna caffrorum Stål, 1856
Gyna capucina Gerstaecker, 1883
Gyna castanea Shelford, 1909
Gyna centurio Dohrn, 1888
Gyna colini Rochebrune, 1883
Gyna costalis Walker, 1868
Gyna crassa Grandcolas, 1994
Gyna cyclops Hanitsch, 1930
Gyna fourcarti Grandcolas, 1994
Gyna gloriosa Stål, 1855
Gyna hyalina Shelford, 1909
Gyna incisura Grandcolas, 1994
Gyna incommoda Shelford, 1909
Gyna jocosa Shelford, 1908
Gyna kazungulana Giglio-Tos, 1907
Gyna laticosta Walker, 1868
Gyna lineata Grandcolas, 1994
Gyna lurida Saussure, 1899
Gyna maculipennis Schaum, 1853
Gyna munda Grandcolas, 1994
Gyna nigrifrons Bolívar, 1889
Gyna oblonga Borg, 1902
Gyna pomposa Brunner von Wattenwyl, 1865
Gyna scheitzae Hanitsch, 1950
Gyna scripta Giglio-Tos, 1916
Gyna sculpturata Shelford, 1909
Gyna scutelligera Walker, 1868
Gyna spurcata Walker, 1868

References 

Blaberidae
Cockroach genera